John Kiersey (25 October 1875 – 18 March 1960) was an Irish politician and farmer. He was elected to Dáil Éireann as a Cumann na nGaedheal Teachta Dála (TD) for the Waterford constituency at the 1932 general election. He lost his seat at the 1933 general election.

He was the  son of David Keirsey, farmer and Johanna Dowley, born in Ballyhussa, County Waterford.

References

1875 births
1960 deaths
Cumann na nGaedheal TDs
Members of the 7th Dáil
Irish farmers
Politicians from County Waterford